Valliyin Selvan is a 1955 Indian Tamil-language children's film written and directed by Kothamangalam Subbu. The film stars Lalitha, Sahasranamam, M. S. Sundari Bai and S. V. Subbaiah.

Plot 
A rich man is childless and wants to remarry. His wife is worried. Their household servant gives his infant son to the lady who convinces the rich man that the baby was born to her. The lady's brother knows the truth. The servant's wife dies. After some time the lady conceives and gives birth to a son. She starts neglecting the servant's son. She also ill treats him. So the servant tries to take away his son. However, the rich man, who is not aware of the truth, thinks the servant is trying to abduct the eldest boy and beats the servant. The elder boy learns that he is the son of  the servant and goes away to live with the servant, his real father. The younger boy becomes very ill. The doctor who examines him says he is affected by the loss of his elder brother and he can be cured only if the elder boy returns home. The lady, mistaking her husband for her brother, tells the truth. Thus, the rich man learns the truth. The rich man begs the servant to give him his son. The servant initially objects but due to the plight of the younger boy, sends his son to the rich man.

Cast 

 Lalitha as Vathsala
 Sahasranamam as Manoharam Pillay
 Sundari Bai as Valli
 S. V. Subbaiah as Kandan
 Vanaja as Leela
 R. Ganesan as Murthy
 T. S. Durairaj as Sheristadar Doraiswamy Pillay
 P. S. Gnanam as Manoharam Pillay's sister
 Master Murali as Raju
 Master Babuji as Balu

Production 
The film was produced by United Film Arts, a subsidiary company of Gemini Studios.

Soundtrack 
Music was composed by P. S. Anantharaman and lyrics were penned by Kothamangalam Subbu.

References

External links 
 

1950s Tamil-language films
1955 films
Films directed by Kothamangalam Subbu
Films with screenplays by Kothamangalam Subbu
Indian black-and-white films
Indian children's films